Bratlie is a surname. Notable people with the surname include:

Gunnar Bratlie (1918–1990), Norwegian illustrator
Jens Bratlie (1856–1939), Norwegian attorney and military officer
Jens Harald Bratlie (born 1948), Norwegian pianist
Sigurd Bratlie (1905–1996), Norwegian church leader